Earina autumnalis, (commonly known as Easter orchid, or in Māori, raupeka) is a species of orchid that is endemic to New Zealand (North and South Islands, plus Chatham Island).

Its small white flowers produce a strong fragrance - a generally pleasant scent which is often compared to vanilla in nature. It generally occurs as an epiphyte or lithophyte - in the former situation it frequently grows in close association with other endemic orchid species such as Winika cunninghamii.

References

External links 
 Picture and description

Endemic orchids of New Zealand
autumnalis
Epiphytic orchids
Taxa named by Georg Forster